The following units and commanders of the American armed forces under Andrew Jackson fought at the Battle of New Orleans during War of 1812. The British order of battle is shown separately.

Abbreviations used

Military rank
 MG = Major General
 BG = Brigadier General
 Col = Colonel
 Ltc = Lieutenant Colonel
 Maj = Major
 Cpt = Captain
 Lt = 1st Lieutenant

Other
 w = wounded
 k = killed
 m = missing

Forces
7th Military District: MG Andrew Jackson

General Staff
Advisers to General Jackson: Brigadier General Jean Joseph Amable Humbert, Governor William C. C. Claiborne
Aides-de-camp: Abner Lawson Duncan, John Randolph Grymes, Edward Livingston
Aide-de-camp and judge advocate, Major Auguste Davezac
Volunteer chief of engineers: Arsene Lacarriere Latour

References

External links
The Battle of New Orleans Order of Battle and Scenario Rules via warof1812wargaming.blogspot

Orders of battle
War of 1812